Richard K. Ransom (September 13, 1919 – April 11, 2016)  was an American businessman and founder of Hickory Farms.

Life 
Ransom graduated from DeVilbiss High School (Toledo, Ohio) in 1938. He served in World War II, at Okinawa. Starting in 1951, he built a specialty foods business, using the technique of "free samples". He sold Hickory Farms to General Host Corporation in 1980.

Philanthropy 
He was on the board of the Toledo Zoo and Riverside Hospital. He was board chairman of St. John's Jesuit High School and Academy.

References 

1919 births
2016 deaths
American food company founders
American military personnel of World War II